DEFRA may refer to:

 Deficit Reduction Act of 1984, United States law
 Department for Environment, Food and Rural Affairs, United Kingdom government department